Thieves' World is a shared world fantasy series created by Robert Lynn Asprin in 1978.  The original series comprised twelve anthologies, including stories by science fiction authors Poul Anderson, John Brunner, Andrew J. Offutt, C. J. Cherryh, Janet Morris, and Chris Morris.

Thieves' World is set in the city of Sanctuary at the edge of the Rankan Empire. The city is depicted as a place where many are downtrodden and where the invading Rankan gods and the Ilsigi gods they had ousted begin a struggle for dominance. As the series continues, additional invasions occur, and the city is taken over by the snake-worshipping Beysib as the Rankan empire collapses. Over time, a number of the characters in the series are revealed either to be the offspring of or otherwise blessed by various figures in the pantheons of the competing deities, and they discover or develop various powers as the series progresses.

First published in 1979, the series went on hiatus in 1989 after the twelfth anthology. In addition to the official anthologies, several authors published novels set in Thieves' World.

In 2002, Lynn Abbey, who co-edited several of the original anthologies, relaunched the series with the novel Sanctuary. It was followed by the anthologies Turning Points and Enemies of Fortune, which contain some returning authors and several new ones. Abbey also oversaw the republication of the original anthologies in omnibus editions.

Concept and origin 
The Thieves' World anthologies were conceived by authors Robert Lynn Asprin, Lynn Abbey, and Gordon R. Dickson during a casual meeting at the Boston science-fiction convention Boskone in 1978. Asprin suggested that the task of world-building was a major hurdle for modern fantasy writers:

"Whenever one set out to write heroic fantasy, it was first necessary to reinvent the universe from scratch regardless of what had gone before. Despite the carefully crafted Hyborean world of Howard or even the delightfully complex town of Lankhmar which Leiber created, every author was expected to beat his head against the writing table and devise a world of his own. Imagine, I proposed, if our favorite sword-and-sorcery characters shared the same settings and time-frames. Imagine the story potentials.”

Abbey described the 1978 meeting as "a casual conversation [that] changed the lives of a couple dozen people who had no idea what they had been missing or what they were getting into." The writers who were recruited for the series saw Thieves' World as both a challenge and an opportunity to bring "new oddments of human behavior, new quirks of character that the authors wouldn't dare put in a universe for which he or she was solely responsible."

Geography 
Abbey stated that the geography of Sanctuary and its surrounding regions shifted due to each writer's needs. "We had Crom-many drugs, magicians, vices, brothels, dives, haunts, curses, and feuds. Sanctuary wasn't a provincial backwater; it wasn't even the Imperial armpit; it was the Black Hole of not-Calcutta."

The city itself was envisioned as a late medieval town with similarities to the Shambles in York, England, and additional elements of Baghdad. The faraway capital city of Ranke is based on Rome. "Nobody knows how big Sanctuary really is. Anytime any one of us needs a secret meeting place we just create one – Sanctuary is either very large or very cramped."

Storylines and chronology 
The dynamics of sharing characters led to occasional conflicts between authors, as referenced by C.J. Cherryh in her afterword to Blood Ties: "You write your first Thieves' World story for pay, you write your second for revenge."

In an interview for Green Ronin's Sanctuary-based roleplaying guides, Abbey explained the increase of interconnected storylines as the series progressed. "The stories of the first few volumes stood by themselves. But starting in about volume three (Shadows of Sanctuary) the authors began collaborating… big time. Eventually just about every author worked with the same plot threads, some of which stretched over several volumes." Authors would often mine each others' stories for plot ideas, with a minor plot point or piece of dialogue turning into a complete story in a subsequent volume.

Asprin addressed the difficulty of the intersecting, overlapping, and diverging timelines in the preface to the fourth collection, Storm Season: "While in earlier volumes I have tried to keep the stories in the order in which they occur, this has proved to be impossible in Storm Season... I've left it to the reader to understand what is happening and construct his/her mental timeline as necessary."

Abbey noted that the interwoven plots eventually hurt the series' readership: "The very plot and character denseness of a Thieves' World volume, while it was eagerly anticipated by long-time readers, was a bit intimidating to anyone who hadn't been following the series from the beginning." Her observation led to a revised approach for the 2002 relaunch. "When we went to work on 'new Thieves' World', we tried to find a happy medium between stand-alone stories and densely interwoven plots. In Turning Points and Enemies of Fortune there are a few events and situations that serve as a backdrop for the stories."

Reception and awards

Industry reactions 
The Thieves' World anthologies are credited as "pioneering and setting the standard for the shared world format", and the Journal of the Fantastic in the Arts cites Thieves' World as the "first and protype of the form".

Science fiction author Cory Doctorow says the series "rocked my world when I was about 13", and author Robin Hobb called its concept of a collective setting and characters "a brilliant idea". Author and game designer Robert J. Schwalb said "Thieves' World is to authors what D&D is to gamers."

Greg Costikyan reviewed Thieves' World in Ares Magazine #1. Costikyan commented that "since fantasy role-playing involves the group production of a multi-hero fantasy story, role-playing fans especially will find Thieves' World enjoyable. [...] The stories themselves range from mediocre to excellent, but all are worth reading."

The Encyclopedia of Fantasy describes the series: "It is in the creation and editorial supervision of the Thieves' World sequence of shared world anthologies... that Robert Lynn Asprin -- in collaboration with Abbey -- has done his most original work."

In the essay included in the second volume, Tales from the Vulgar Unicorn, Asprin noted that, though fan response was mostly positive and high sales had led to sequels and the development of the Chaosium board game, many readers had written to the publisher to comment on the series' overall lack of humor.

Awards 
Thieves' World

 Balrog Award 1980: Best Collection/Anthology (nominated)
 Locus Award 1980: Best Collection/Anthology (nominated)
 World Fantasy Award 1980: Best Collection/Anthology (nominated)

Tales from the Vulgar Unicorn

 Balrog Award 1981: Best Collection/Anthology (nominated)
 Locus Award 1981: Best Collection/Anthology (nominated)

Shadows of Sanctuary

 Balrog Award 1982: Best Collection/Anthology (winner)
 Locus Award 1982: Best Collection/Anthology (winner)

Original anthologies (1979-1989)
Thieves' World (1979) 
"Introduction" by Robert Lynn Asprin
"Sentences of Death" by John Brunner
"The Face of Chaos" by Lynn Abbey
"The Gate of the Flying Knives" by Poul Anderson
"Shadowspawn" by Andrew Offutt
"The Price of Doing Business" by Robert Lynn Asprin
"Blood Brothers" by Joe Haldeman
"Myrtis" by Christine DeWees
"The Secret of the Blue Star" by Marion Zimmer Bradley
Essay: "The Making of Thieves' World" by Robert Lynn Asprin
Tales from the Vulgar Unicorn (1980) 
"Introduction" by Robert Lynn Asprin
"Spiders of the Purple Mage" by Philip José Farmer
"Goddess" by David Drake
"The Fruit of Enlibar" by Lynn Abbey
"The Dream of the Sorceress" by A.E. van Vogt
"Vashanka's Minion" by Janet Morris
"Shadow's Pawn" by Andrew J. Offutt
"To Guard the Guardians" by Robert Lynn Asprin
Essay: "The Lighter Side of Sanctuary" by Robert Lynn Asprin
Shadows of Sanctuary (1981) 
"Looking for Satan" by Vonda N. McIntyre
"Ischade" by C.J. Cherryh
"A Gift in Parting" by Robert Lynn Asprin
"The Vivisectionist" by Andrew J. Offutt
"The Rhinoceros and the Unicorn" by Diana L. Paxson
"Then Azyuna Danced" by Lynn Abbey
"A Man and His God" by Janet Morris
Essay: "Things the Editor Never Told Me" by Lynn Abbey
Storm Season (1982) 
Introduction by Robert Lynn Asprin
"Exercise in Pain" by Robert Lynn Asprin
"Downwind" by C. J. Cherryh
"A Fugitive Art" by Diana L. Paxson
"Steel" by Lynn Abbey
"Wizard Weather" by Janet Morris
"Godson" by Andrew J. Offutt
Epilog by Robert Lynn Asprin
The Face of Chaos (1983) 
"High Moon" by Janet Morris
"Necromant" by C. J. Cherryh
"The Art of Alliance" by Robert Lynn Asprin
"The Corners of Memory" by Lynn Abbey
"Votary" by David Drake
"Mirror Image" by Diana L. Paxson
Wings of Omen (1984) 
"What Women Do Best" by Chris and Janet Morris
"Daughter of the Sun" by Robin W. Bailey
"A Breath of Power" by Diana L. Paxson
"The Hand That Feeds You" by Diane Duane
"Witching Hour" by C. J. Cherryh
"Rebels Aren't Born in Palaces" by Andrew J. Offutt
"Gyskouras" by Lynn Abbey
"A Fish With Feathers is Out of His Depth" by Robert Lynn Asprin
The Dead of Winter (1985) 
"Hell to Pay" by Janet Morris
"The Veiled Lady, or A Look at the Normal Folk" by Andrew Offutt
"The God-Chosen" by Lynn Abbey
"Keeping Promises" by Robin W. Bailey
"Armies of the Night" by C. J. Cherryh
"Down by the Riverside" by Diane Duane
"When the Spirit Moves You" by Robert Lynn Asprin
"The Color of Magic" by Diana L. Paxson
Soul of the City (1986) 
"Power Play" by Janet Morris
"Dagger in the Mind" by C. J. Cherryh
"Children of All Ages" by Lynn Abbey
"Death in the Meadow" by C. J. Cherryh
"The Small Powers that Endure" by Lynn Abbey
"Pillar of Fire" by Janet Morris
Blood Ties (1986) 
"Introduction" by Robert Lynn Asprin
"Lady of Fire" by Diana L. Paxson
"Sanctuary Is for Lovers" by Janet and Chris Morris
"Lovers Who Slay Together" by Robin Wayne Bailey
"In the Still of the Night" by C. J. Cherryh
"No Glad in Gladiator" by Robert Lynn Asprin
"The Tie That Binds" by Diane Duane
"Sanctuary Nocturne" by Lynn Abbey
"Spellmaster" by Andrew Offutt and Jodie Offutt
"Afterword" by C. J. Cherryh
Aftermath (1987) 
"Introduction" by Robert Lynn Asprin
"Cade" by Mark C. Perry
"Wake of the Riddler" by Janet Morris
"Inheritor" by David Drake
"Mercy Worse Than None" by John Brunner
"Seeing is Believing (But Love Is Blind)" by Lynn Abbey
"Homecoming" by Andrew Offutt
Uneasy Alliances (1988) 
"Introduction" by Lynn Abbey
"Slave Trade" by Robert Lynn Asprin
"The Best of Friends" by C. J. Cherryh
"The Power of Kings" by Jon DeCles
"Red Light, Love Light" by Chris Morris
"A Sticky Business" by C. S. Williams
"The Promise of Heaven" by Robin Wayne Bailey
"The Vision of Lalo" by Diana L. Paxson
Stealers' Sky (1989) 
"Introduction" by Robert Lynn Asprin
"Night Work" by Andrew Offutt
"The Incompetent Audience" by John DeCles
"Our Vintage Years" by Duane McGowen
"Quicksilver Dreams" by Diana L. Paxson
"Winds of Fortune" by C. J. Cherryh
"The Fire in a God's Eye" by Robin Wayne Bailey
"Web Weavers" by Lynn Abbey
"To Begin Again" by Robert Lynn Asprin

New anthologies (2002-2004)
Turning Points (2002)
Introduction by Lynn Abbey
"Home Is Where the Hate Is" by Mickey Zucker Reichert
"Role Model" by Andrew Offutt
"The Prisoner in the Jewel" by Diane L. Paxson
"Ritual Evolution" by Selina Rosen
"Duel" by Dennis L. Mckiernan
"Ring of Sea and Fire" by Robin Wayne Bailey
"Doing the Gods' Work" by Jody Lynn Nye
"The Red Lucky" by Lynn Abbey
"Apocalypse Noun" by Jeff Grubb
"One to Go" by Raymond E. Feist
Afterword by Lynn Abbey
Enemies of Fortune (2004)
Introduction by Lynn Abbey
"Widowmaker" by C. J. Cherryh and Jane Fancher
"Deadly Ritual" by Mickey Zucker Reichert
"Pricks and Afflictions" by Dennis L. Mckiernan
"Consequences" by Jody Lynn Nye
"Good Neighbours" by Lynn Abbey
"Gathering Strength" by Selina Rosen
"Dark of the Moon" by Andrew Offutt
"Protection" by Robin Wayne Bailey
"Legacies" by Jane Fancher and C. J. Cherryh
"Malediction" by Jeff Grubb
"The Ghost in the Phoenix" by Diana L. Paxson and Ian Grey
"The Man from Shemhaza" by Steven Brust

Novels and collections
Several Thieves' World standalone novels and short stories have been published in addition to the official anthologies.

Janet Morris introduced The Sacred Band of Stepsons in Thieves' World and expanded their story in a series of novels about them and their ancient cavalry commander, Tempus. The first three novels in The Sacred Band of Stepsons saga were authorized Thieves' World novels. Marion Zimmer Bradley was an early contributor to the Thieves' World anthologies, but spun off her main character in the novel Lythande (1986) and did not return for later volumes.

The official Thieves' World novels are:
Janet Morris, Beyond Sanctuary (1985), a Science Fiction Book club Selection, Baen Books
Janet Morris, Beyond the Veil (1985), a Science Fiction Book Club Selection, Baen Books
Janet Morris, Beyond Wizardwall (1986), a Science Fiction Book Club Selection, Baen Books
Andrew J. Offutt, Shadowspawn (1987)
David Drake, Dagger (1988) - The first part of the novel appeared in the anthology Aftermath.
Andrew J. Offutt, The Shadow of Sorcery (1993)
Lynn Abbey, Sanctuary (2002) Tor Books

Other novels/collections include:
Marion Zimmer Bradley, Lythande (1986) - collection - includes two stories from the anthologies
Janet Morris, Tempus (1987) - novel collecting the Tempus stories from the anthologies with additional content
Janet Morris, Chris Morris, City at the Edge of Time (1988) - novel
Janet Morris, Chris Morris, Tempus Unbound (1989) - novel
Janet Morris, Chris Morris, Storm Seed (1990) - novel
Janet Morris, Chris Morris, The Sacred Band (2010) - novel
Janet Morris, Chris Morris, Tempus With His Right Side Companion Niko (2011) - novelization and edit of previously released material
Janet Morris, Chris Morris, The Fish the Fighters and the Song-girl (2012) - novelization and edit of previously released material
The first six Morris novels were published in mass market paperback by Ace Books and subsequently expanded in Author's Cut trade paper editions by Perseid Press.

Short stories
Poul Anderson, "The Valor of Cappen Varra" (1957) - short story - first published in Fantastic Universe Science Fiction magazine
Marion Zimmer Bradley, "Bitch" (1987) - short story, in  The Magazine of Fantasy & Science Fiction, February 1987
Marion Zimmer Bradley, "The Walker Behind" (1987) - short story - The Magazine of Fantasy & Science Fiction, July 1987
Marion Zimmer Bradley, "The Malice of the Demon" (1988) - short story  - The Magazine of Fantasy & Science Fiction, September 1988
Marion Zimmer Bradley, "Here There Be Dragons?" (1995) - short story
Robin Wayne Bailey, "The Stars Are Tears" (1996) - short story
Marion Zimmer Bradley, "The Gratitude of Kings" (1998) - short story
Poul Anderson, "The Lady of the Winds" (2001) - short story - later collected in Tor Books anthology First Blood
 Lynn Abbey, "A Tale of Two Cities" (2005) - short story included in the Thieves' World Player's Manual

Omnibuses
 Sanctuary 1982. Book Club hardcover omnibus collecting Thieves’ World, Tales from the Vulgar Unicorn, and Shadows of Sanctuary.
 Cross-Currents 1984. Book Club Hardcover omnibus collecting: "Storm Season", “The Face of Chaos”, and "Wings of Omen".
 The Shattered Sphere 1986. Book Club Hardcover omnibus collecting: “The Dead of Winter”, “Soul of the City”, and “Blood Ties”.
 The Price of Victory 1989. Book Club Hardcover omnibus collecting: "Aftermath", "Uneasy Alliances", and "Stealers’ Sky".
 First Blood 2003. Tor Paperback omnibus collecting Thieves’ World, Tales from the Vulgar Unicorn, and "The Lady of the Winds".

Comics
Published by Starblaze Graphics and illustrated by Tim Sale, the original series was produced in black and white except for the covers.

Thieves' World Graphics 1 (1985). Containing: 1) "Introduction" 2) "Someone is always awake in Sanctuary..." (original) 3) "Sentences of Death" 4) "Myrtis" 5) "The Price of Doing Business"
Thieves' World Graphics 2 (1986). Containing: 1) Blood Brothers; 2) The Face of Chaos; 3) Gaeta (original); 4) Shadowspawn.
Thieves' World Graphics 3 (1986). Containing: 1) The Dream of the Sorceress; The Blue Camel (original); 3) Vashanka's Minion.
Thieves' World Graphics 4 (1986). Containing: 1) Shadow's Pawn; 2) Runcigor and Alminda (original); 3) To Guard the Guardians.
Thieves' World Graphics 5 (1987). Containing: 1) Looking for Satan; 2) Ischade; 3) A Gift in Parting.
Thieves' World Graphics 6 (1987). Containing: 1) The Vivisectionist; 2) The Rhinoceros and the Unicorn; 3) Arvo the Nose (original).

Thieves' World Graphics (1986) collects volumes 1 to 3 above, colorized and with a new cover by David A. Cherry

Role playing games
 Thieves' World Complete Sanctuary Adventure Pack (Chaosium Box Set, 1981). Containing: 1) The Player's Guide to Sanctuary; 2) The Gamemaster's Guide to Sanctuary; 3) Personalities of Sanctuary; 4) Map of Sanctuary; 5) Map of the Maze; 6) Map of the Maze Underground.
 The Blue Camel (mini-adventure; FASA, 1982)
 T1 - Traitor (FASA, 1982)
 T2 - Spirit Stones (FASA, 1982)
 T3 - Dark Assassin (FASA, 1982)
 T4 - Vengeance (FASA, 198?)
 Sanctuary Under the Beysibs (Chaosium Companion, 1986)
 Thieves' World Player's Manual (Green Ronin, 2005)
 Shadowspawn's Guide to Sanctuary (Green Ronin, 2005)
 Thieves' World Gazetteer (Green Ronin, 2005)
 Murder at the Vulgar Unicorn (Green Ronin, 2005)
 Black Snake Dawn (Green Ronin, 2007)

Board game
 Sanctuary: Thieves' World (Mayfair Games, 1982).

Characters

References

External links
Interview with Lynn Abbey
Interview with several Thieves' World contributors

 
Ace Books books
Fantasy anthology series
Fantasy novel series
Fantasy worlds
Collaborative book series
Novels adapted into comics
Novels by Robert Asprin
Sword and sorcery
Shared universes